Jackson Chirwa (born 11 June 1995) is a Zambian footballer who plays as a midfielder for Green Buffaloes F.C. and the Zambia national football team.

Career

International
Chirwa made his senior international debut on 4 July 2015 in a 2-1 victory over Namibia during 2016 CHAN qualification.

International Goals
Scores and results list Zambia's goal tally first.

References

External links

1995 births
Living people
Green Buffaloes F.C. players
Zambian footballers
Zambia international footballers
Association football midfielders
Zambia A' international footballers
2016 African Nations Championship players
2018 African Nations Championship players
2020 African Nations Championship players